Thomas M. Rutledge is an American communications executive who serves as executive chairman of Charter Communications, having previously served as chairman and CEO before retiring as CEO in December 2022.  He previously also served as president of the company from 2012 to 2016. 

Before joining Charter, he served as COO of Cablevision from 2004 until 2011. He also previously served as president of Time Warner Cable. Rutledge is currently the chairman of the board of the National Cable and Telecommunications Association (NCTA), and currently serves on the boards of CableLabs and C-SPAN. In 2011, he received NCTA's Vanguard Award for Distinguished Leadership, the cable industry's highest honor. He is also a member of the Cable Hall of Fame, and was inducted into the Broadcasting and Cable Hall of Fame in 2011. He attended California University in California, Pennsylvania where he graduated with a B.A. in economics in 1977.

References

External links

Treatment of employees during a pandemic.

Living people
Year of birth missing (living people)
California University of Pennsylvania alumni
American business executives